"Still Reminds Me" is a song by Indonesian singer Anggun, released as the first single from her second international album Chrysalis. There's also a French version titled "Derriere la Porte", recorded for the French version of Anggun's second international album, Désirs Contraires. Originally the song was written in French by Erick Benzi and then Anggun adapted it in English. The song was a hit in several countries across Europe and Asia. It became a number-one hit in Indonesia and charted inside the top 20 in Italy and the top 5 on the "Music & Media Europe Border Breakers Chart". Moreover, the French version "Derriere la Porte" was awarded as "French Song of the Year" by Radio France Internationale, the French radio network throughout the world.

Track listing and formats 
European 12" vinyl single
A1 "Still Reminds Me" (Jason Nevins Extended Club Mix) – 9:37
A2 "Still Reminds Me" (Jason Nevins Extended Club Edit) – 4:45
A3 "Still Reminds Me" (Special Radio Edit) – 3:35
B1 "Still Reminds Me" (Jason Nevins Dub Mix -With Fade-Out-) – 9:18
B2 "Snow on the Sahara" (Amen Club Mix) – 7:29

French CD maxi single
"Still Reminds Me" (Special Radio Edit) – 3:25
"Still Reminds Me" (Jason Nevins Midtempo Radio Edit) – 3:33
"Still Reminds Me" (Jason Nevins Uptempo Radio Remix) – 4:45
"Still Reminds Me" (Jason Nevins Club Mix) – 9:37
"Still Reminds Me" (Special Radio Edit) – 3:29

French CD single
"Derrière la porte" – 3:50
"Still Reminds Me" – 3:58

Charts

References

Anggun songs
2000 singles
Songs written by Erick Benzi
Song recordings produced by Erick Benzi
2000 songs
Sony Music singles
Songs written by Anggun